América Futebol Clube, commonly known as América de Caaporã, is a Brazilian football club based in Caaporã, Paraíba state.

History
The club was founded on November 19, 1944.

Stadium
América Futebol Clube play their home games at Estádio Frederico Lundgren, nicknamed Lundrigão. The stadium has a maximum capacity of 3,000 people.

References

Association football clubs established in 1944
Football clubs in Paraíba
1944 establishments in Brazil